One Entrance, Many Exits is an album by American jazz pianist Mal Waldron recorded in 1982 and released by the Palo Alto label.

Reception 
In the Allmusic review by Scott Yanow, he stated: "the combination of musicians works quite well. Pianist Mal Waldron has an inside/outside post bop style that matches perfectly with tenor-saxophonist Joe Henderson, bassist David Friesen and drummer Billy Higgins."

Track listing
All compositions by Mal Waldron, except as indicated
 "Golden Golson" — 8:33 
 "One Entrance, Many Exits" — 10:30 
 "Chazz Jazz" — 5:31 
 "Herbal Syndrome" — 6:19 
 "How Deep Is the Ocean?" (Irving Berlin) — 4:43 
 "Blues in 4 by 3" — 7:29 
Recorded in Menlo Park, California, on January 4, 1982

Personnel 
 Mal Waldron — piano 
 Joe Henderson — tenor saxophone (tracks 1, 4 & 5)
 David Friesen — bass
 Billy Higgins — drums (tracks 1 & 4-6)

References 

Palo Alto Records albums
Mal Waldron albums
1983 albums